Randee Drew (born November 22, 1982) is an American former gridiron football defensive back, who most recently played for the Edmonton Eskimos of the Canadian Football League (CFL) . He was signed by the San Francisco 49ers as an undrafted free agent in 2004. He played college football at Northern Illinois.

Drew has also been a member of the Cologne Centurions, Orlando Predators, Green Bay Blizzard, BC Lions and Montreal Alouettes.

References

External links
 Montreal Alouettes bio

1982 births
Living people
American football defensive backs
American players of Canadian football
Canadian football defensive backs
BC Lions players
Cologne Centurions (NFL Europe) players
Edmonton Elks players
Green Bay Blizzard players
Montreal Alouettes players
Northern Illinois Huskies football players
Orlando Predators players
Sportspeople from Milwaukee
San Francisco 49ers players
Players of American football from Milwaukee